Triple-cream cheese or fromage triple-crème is cheese which contains more than 75% fat in its dry matter, that is, roughly 40% fat overall, similar to the fat content of extra-heavy liquid cream.  Triple-crème cheeses taste rich and creamy.

Some triple-crèmes are fresh, like mascarpone.  Others are soft-ripened, like Brillat-Savarin, Boursault, Blue Castello, Explorateur, and St. André.

References

Types of cheese